Down Your Way was a BBC radio series which ran from 29 December 1946 to 1992, originally on the Home Service, later on BBC Radio 4, usually being broadcast on Sunday afternoons. It visited towns and villages around the United Kingdom, spoke to residents and played their choice of music.

It was initially hosted by Stewart MacPherson, who presented the first twelve shows, but in 1947, after brief hosting spells by Lionel Gamlin and Wynford Vaughan-Thomas, Richard Dimbleby took over its presentation until 1955, then Franklin Engelmann until his death in 1972 when Brian Johnston took over until 1987. In 1975, despite then being the second most popular programme on radio, it was taken off the air as an 'economy measure'. It was subsequently reinstated, after a storm of popular protest.

From 1987 until its demise in 1992 it had a different celebrity host every week, who would visit a place of significance in their own liveseffectively turning it into 'Down My Way' and blending it into the then-emerging celebrity culture.

Its well-remembered signature tune was "Horse Guards, Whitehall" by Haydn Wood.

In the early 1980s the show was satirised on The Kenny Everett Television Show as "Up Your Way", a saccharine television version presented by "Verity Treacle". In 1984, it was parodied by Radio Active as "Round Your Parts".

References

External links
Down Your Way at whirligig-tv.co.uk

BBC Home Service programmes
Cultural geography
BBC Radio 4 programmes